David Gilbert Yates (1870 – May 9, 1918)  was an American otorhinolaryngologist, born in New Jersey.  He attended private schools and after a brief stint as a journalist entered New York University, receiving his medical degree in 1898.  He performed surgery at the Manhattan Eye, Ear and Throat Hospital, and at other facilities.

He contributed many original papers to the literature of his specialty, and at various times was contributing editor of the Medical Critic and of the New International Yearbook, and medical editor of the New International Encyclopedia.

External links
  New York Times obituary, May 10, 1918 (subscription required)

1870 births
1918 deaths
American medical writers
American male non-fiction writers
American otolaryngologists
New York University Grossman School of Medicine alumni
Physicians from New Jersey
Physicians from New York City